Cnaphalocrocis liliicola is a moth in the family Crambidae. It was described by Jean Ghesquière in 1942. It is found in North Kivu, Democratic Republic of the Congo.

The larvae feed on Kniphofia bequaerti.

References

Moths described in 1942
Spilomelinae